Thomas Charles Hope (21 July 1766 – 13 June 1844) was a British physician, chemist and lecturer.

In 1815 Hope was elected as president of the Royal College of Physicians of Edinburgh (1815–19), and as vice-president of Royal Society of Edinburgh (1823–33) during the presidencies of Walter Scott and Thomas Makdougall Brisbane.

He founded a chemistry prize at the University of Edinburgh.

Charles Darwin was one of Hope's students, and Darwin viewed his chemistry lectures as highlights in his otherwise largely dull education at the University.

Early life
Born in Edinburgh, the third son of Juliana Stevenson and surgeon and botanist John Hope, he lived at High School Yards on the south side of the old town. He was educated next door to his house at the High School, the University of Edinburgh (MD 1787) and the University of Paris. At the university he was a student of Prof Joseph Black.

Hope was a nephew of the physician Alexander Stevenson FRSE.

University of Glasgow and the discovery of strontium
He was appointed lecturer in chemistry at the University of Glasgow in 1787, and professor of medicine in 1789.

In January 1788, on the proposal of John Walker, Daniel Rutherford and Alexander Monro, he was elected a Fellow of the Royal Society of Edinburgh.

In 1791–1792 Hope completed experiments on the chemical element strontium, proposing the name Stronities for it, after Strontian, the west highland village where he found strontianite. The element was later renamed to Strontium. On 4 November 1793, Hope presented his findings, An account of a Mineral from Strontian and of a Peculiar Species of Earth which it contains, to the Royal Society of Edinburgh.

In the experiment that bears his name, Hope determined the maximum density of water and explained why icebergs float.

Edinburgh and the university
Hope was elected a Fellow of the Royal Society of Edinburgh in 1788 and served as its vice president from 1822 to 1833.

In 1791 following the death of his uncle, Alexander Stevenson, Hope succeeded him in his uncle's role as Professor of Medicine at Glasgow University.

In 1795 Hope was selected by Joseph Black as his assistant (1795–1799) and eventual successor to the professorship of medicine and chemistry (1799–1843) at the University of Edinburgh. Hope’s goal was to more fully combine the practice of medicine with his chemical instruction.

In 1800 Hope won the annual Edinburgh Arrow archery competition.

In 1804 he became a member of the Highland Society.

In 1805 he was elected a member of the Aesculapian Club.

In May 1810 he was elected a Fellow of the Royal Society of London.

From 1815 to 1819 he served as President of the Royal College of Physicians of Edinburgh.

Between 1824–40 Hope worked with scientists based in Poissy, France. With the town's major, Jean-François Senincourt, he tried to establish a university in the town. Within a few years their aims began to be realised as medical students crowded his lectures.

In the 1830s he is listed as living at 31 Moray Place, a large townhouse in the Moray Estate on the western edge of Edinburgh's New Town.

In 1843 he resigned the professorship. He died at his home, 31 Moray Place in Edinburgh's West End in 1844.

He is buried in Greyfriars Kirkyard in central Edinburgh. The grave lies against the western wall of the original churchyard, towards the north-west corner.

Works

Hope's apparatus  

Hope's apparatus consists of a vertical vessel full of water surrounded round the middle by a trough of cooling ice. Two thermometers, one above and one below the trough, measure the temperature of the water.

As the water in the central part of the vessel cools towards  (and thus becomes denser) it sinks to the bottom of the vessel, displacing the warmer water. The lower thermometer will then read a constant . Further cooling towards  will cause the now less dense water to rise to the top of the vessel, where the upper thermometer will then read a constant .

References

 Chemistry at the University of Edinburgh
 Hope's apparatus
 His page in the Gazetteer for Scotland

Further reading
 

1766 births
1844 deaths
Thomas
Paintings by Henry Raeburn
Scientists from Edinburgh
People educated at the Royal High School, Edinburgh
Alumni of the University of Edinburgh
19th-century British chemists
18th-century Scottish medical doctors
19th-century Scottish medical doctors
18th-century Scottish people
19th-century Scottish people
18th-century Scottish scientists
19th-century Scottish scientists
University of Paris alumni
Academics of the University of Glasgow
Academics of the University of Edinburgh
Discoverers of chemical elements
Fellows of the Royal Society
Fellows of the Royal Society of Edinburgh
Members of the Royal Irish Academy
Fellows of the Royal College of Physicians of Edinburgh
Presidents of the Royal College of Physicians of Edinburgh
Scottish male archers
Scottish chemists
Scottish physicists
18th-century British chemists
Burials at Greyfriars Kirkyard
Medical doctors from Edinburgh